Alicia Vignoli (1911–2005) was an Argentine film actress.

Filmography
 Y era una noche de carnaval (1925)
 La borrachera del tango (1928)
 ¡Tango! (1933)
 Dancing (1933)
 Ayer y hoy (1934)
 Puerto nuevo (1936)
 El pobre Pérez (1937)
 La casa de Quirós (1937)
 ¡Segundos afuera! (1937)
 Palabra de honor (1939)
 El viejo doctor (1939)
 Muchachas que estudian (1939)
 Persona honrada se necesita (1941)
 La canción de los barrios (1941)
 La importancia de ser ladrón (1944)

References

Bibliography
 Jorge Finkielman. The Film Industry in Argentina: An Illustrated Cultural History. McFarland, 2003.

External links

1911 births
2005 deaths
Argentine film actresses
People from Buenos Aires